is a Japanese kickboxer, currently competing in the lightweight division of K-1. A professional competitor since 2014, he is the former Krush Super Lightweight champion and a one-time Krush Lightweight title challenger.

As of January 2023, he is the #9 ranked featherweight kickboxer in the world according to Beyond Kick. Combat Press ranked him as a top ten super bantamweight between March and May 2022, and as a top ten bantamweight between February 2019 and June 2020.

Kickboxing career

Super lightweight

Career beginnings
Shinohara made his professional debut against Tasuku Kido at HOOST CUP KINGS WEST on November 16, 2014. He won the fight by a first-round knockout. Shinohara faced Shinichiro Kawasaki a month later, at DEEP KICK 23 on December 21, 2014. He won the fight by unanimous decision. After notching his first two professional wins, Shinohara returned to amateur competition, in order to take part in the K-1 Koshien 2015 Tournament. He won the Koshien title with a third-round knockout of Kensei Kondo at K-1 World GP 2015 The Championship on November 21, 2015.

His spotless professional record and the Koshien tournament win, led to Shihonara being signed by K-1. He made his debut with the organization against Yuki Koge at K-1 World GP 2016 -60kg Japan Tournament on April 24, 2016. He won the fight by a second-round knockout, stopping Koge with a flurry of punches at the 1:15 minute mark.

Shinohara next made his debut with K-1's sister organization Krush, as he was booked to face Daiki Matsushita at Krush.67 on July 18, 2016. Matsushita won the fight by a second-round knockout, handing Shinohara both his first professional loss and his first stoppage loss. Shinohara next faced Tatsuya Mineyama at K-1 World GP 2016 Featherweight Championship Tournament on November 3, 2016. He won the fight by unanimous decision, with all three judges scoring the bout 30–27 in his favor.

After successfully rebounding from his loss to Matsushita, Shinohara took part in the Krush Super Lightweight tournament, held to crown the new champion as Hideaki Yamazaki was stripped of the title due to injuries. He was booked to face Jun Nakazawa in the tournament semifinals, which were held at Krush.73 on February 18, 2017. He lost the fight by a second-round knockout. Shinohara was first knocked down with a left hook midway through the round, and was knocked out with a second left hook soon afterwards.

Title run
Shinohara faced Kensei Kondo Krush.79 ～in NAGOYA～ on August 20, 2017. The two previously fought in the finals of the 2015 K-1 Koshien tournament, with Shinohara winning by a third-round knockout. He was proved to be the better fighter in their second meeting as well, winning the fight by a second-round knockout.

Shinohara faced FUMIYA at KHAOS.4 on October 14, 2017, representing Kansai in a "Kantō vs Kansai 6 versus 6" themed event. He won the fight by a third-round knockout, stopping FUMIYA with a right cross a minute into the round. Shinohara was furthemore awarded the MVP prize as well, as the best fighter of the event.

Following a split decision victory against Hayato Suzuki at K-1 WORLD GP 2017 JAPAN ～SURVIVAL WARS 2017～ on December 27, 2017, Shinohara returned to Krush to face Takaki Hosogoe at Krush.86 on March 11, 2018. He won the fight by unanimous decision, with all three judges awarding him a 30–27 scorecard.

Shinohara was booked to face FUMIYA at Krush.88 on May 17, 2018. The pair had fought just seven months prior, with Shinohara winning by a third-round knockout. He won the rematch in the same manner, forcing a referee stoppage at the 1:50 minute mark, after having knocked FUMIYA down twice with left hooks.

Krush super lightweight champion

Shinohara vs. Nakazawa
At a press conference held by Krush on June 28, 2018, it was announced that Shinohara would challenge the reigning Krush Super Lightweight champion Jun Nakazawa, in what was Nakazawa's second title defense. The bout was scheduled as the co-main event of Krush.91, which was held on August 5, 2018. He won the closely contested fight by split decision. Two of the judges scored the fight 30–29 in his favor, while the third judge scored the fight 30–29 for Nakazawa. Shinohara stated his desire to move down to lightweight (62.5kg) in his post-fight interview, as he felt at a weight disadvantage at super lightweight.

K-1 Lightweight Grand Prix
On October 20, 2018, K-1 announced they would hold a Lightweight Grand Prix at K-1 World GP 2018: K-1 Lightweight World's Strongest Tournament on December 8, 2018. Shinohara was booked to face the reigning Krush Lightweight champion Kongnapa Weerasakreck in the tournament quarterfinals. Shinohara knocked Kongnapa with a left hook early in the first round, and although he was able to beat the ten count, Shinohara knocked down him a second time with another left hook soon after. These two knockdowns awarded Shinohara an automatic technical knockout victory under the K-1 tournament rules. He needed just 25 seconds to advance to the next round.

Shinohara advanced to the tournament semifinals, where he faced Kenta Hayashi. Hayashi first knocked Shinohara down with a right hook, before stopping him with a right cross at the 2:31 minute mark of the first-round. Ten days later, on December 18, Shinohara vacated the Krush super lightweight title.

Move to lightweight
Shinohara faced the 2018 K-1 Lightweight Grand Prix finalist Fumiya Osawa at K-1 World GP 2019: K'FESTA 2 on March 10, 2019. The fight was judged a unanimous decision draw after the first three rounds, with scores of 29–29, 29–29 and 30–30. Accordingly, an extra round was contested, after which Shinohara was awarded the unanimous decision.

Shinohara faced Shinichiro Kawasaki at K-1 World GP 2019: Japan vs World 5 vs 5 & Special Superfight in Osaka on August 24, 2019. The pair previously fought at DEEP KICK 23 on December 21, 2014, with Shinohara winning by unanimous decision. He won the rematch in the same manner, with all three judges scoring the fight 28–26 in his favor. Shinohara was knocked down with a left hook at the 2:02 minute mark of the second round, but was able to knock Kawasaki down twice before the end of the round himself.

Shinohara was rewarded with this two-fight winning streak with the chance to challenge the reigning Krush Lightweight champion Kongnapa Weerasakreck, in the main event of Krush.113 on June 28, 2020. He lost the fight by unanimous decision. Two of the judges scored the fight 30–28 for Kongnapa, while the third judge awarded Kongnapa a 30–29 scorecard.

Shinohara faced the former two-weight K-1 champion Koya Urabe at K-1 World GP 2020 in Osaka on September 22, 2020. Urabe won the fight by unanimous decision, after an extra fourth round was fought.

Shinohara was expected to face the former Krush Super Featherweight champion Yuma Saikyo at K-1: K’Festa 4 on January 24, 2021. The entire event was later postponed as the Japanese prime minister Yoshihide Suga declared a state of emergency for Tokyo, due to the COVID-19 pandemic. Shinohara and Saikyo were rescheduled to face each-other at K-1 World GP 2021: K’Festa 4 Day.2 on March 31, 2021. Shinohara lost the fight by split decision, with scores of 30–29, 29–30 and 29–30.

Shinohara was booked to face Toshiki Taniyama at K-1 World GP 2021: Yokohamatsuri on September 20, 2021. He won the fight by unanimous decision, with scores of 30–27, 30–26 and 30–25. Shinohara knocked Taniyama down twice in the third round, first time with repeated knees and the second time with a right hook.

Shinohara faced the promotional newcomer Katsuki Ishida at K-1 World GP 2021 in Osaka on December 4, 2021. He won the fight by unanimous decision, with scores of 30–29, 30–28 and 30–27.

Shinohara faced the reigning Krush Lightweight champion Shuji Kawarada at K-1 World GP 2022 Japan on February 27, 2022. He won the fight by unanimous decision, with all three judges scoring the fight 30–29 in his favor.

Shinohara faced the multiple-time world and All Japan Kyokushin karate champion Yuki Yoza at K-1 World GP 2022 in Fukuoka on August 11, 2022. He was stopped by low kicks midway through the second round.

Shinohara faced Hiroki at K-1 World GP 2022 in Osaka on December 3, 2022. He won the fight by unanimous decision, with scores of 30–27, 30–27 and 30–26. Shinohara knocked his opponent down with a right straight at the end of the final round.

Titles and accomplishments

Professional
Krush
2018 Krush Super Lightweight -65 kg Champion

Amateur
DEEP KICK
2010 TOP RUN Junior -50 kg Champion
2011 TOP RUN Junior -55 kg Champion
2013 TOP RUN -60 kg Champion
New Japanese Kickboxing Federation
2014 NJKF Amateur -65 kg Champion
K-1
2015 K-1 Koshien -65 kg Champion

Kickboxing record

|- style="background:#cfc"
| 2022-12-03|| Win ||align=left| Hiroki ||  K-1 World GP 2022 in Osaka || Osaka, Japan || Decision (Unanimous) || 3 || 3:00
|-  style="background:#fbb"
| 2022-08-11|| Loss||align=left| Yuki Yoza ||  K-1 World GP 2022 in Fukuoka || Fukuoka, Japan || TKO (Low kicks)|| 2 ||1:12
|-
|- style="background:#cfc"
| 2022-02-27|| Win||align=left| Shuji Kawarada ||  K-1 World GP 2022 Japan || Tokyo, Japan || Decision (Unanimous) || 3 || 3:00 
|-  style="text-align:center; background:#cfc"
| 2021-12-04 || Win|| align=left| Katsuki Ishida || K-1 World GP 2021 in Osaka || Osaka, Japan || Decision (Unanimous) || 3 || 3:00
|-  style="background:#cfc;"
| 2021-09-20 || Win ||align=left| Toshiki Taniyama ||K-1 World GP 2021: Yokohamatsuri || Yokohama, Japan || Decision (Unanimous) || 3 || 3:00
|-  style="background:#fbb;"
| 2021-03-28|| Loss ||align=left| Yuma Saikyo || K-1 World GP 2021: K’Festa 4 Day.2 || Tokyo, Japan || Decision (Split) ||3 || 3:00
|-  style="background:#fbb;"
| 2020-09-22|| Loss || align=left| Koya Urabe || K-1 World GP 2020 in Osaka|| Osaka, Japan || Ext.R Decision (Unanimous) ||4 ||3:00
|- style="background:#fbb;"
| 2020-06-28|| Loss ||align=left| Kongnapa Weerasakreck || Krush.113 || Tokyo, Japan ||Decision (Unanimous) || 3 || 3:00
|-
! style=background:white colspan=9 |
|- style="background:#CCFFCC;"
| 2019-08-24|| Win ||align=left| Shinichiro Kawasaki ||K-1 World GP 2019: Japan vs World 5 vs 5 & Special Superfight in Osaka || Osaka, Japan || Decision (Unanimous) || 3 || 3:00
|-style="background:#cfc;"
| 2019-03-10|| Win|| align=left| Fumiya Osawa || K-1 World GP 2019: K'FESTA 2 || Saitama, Japan || Ext.R Decision (Unanimous) || 4 || 3:00
|-  style="background:#FFBBBB;"
| 2018-12-08|| Loss ||align=left| Kenta Hayashi || K-1 World GP 2018: K-1 Lightweight World's Strongest Tournament, Semi Finals ||Osaka, Japan|| KO (Right cross) || 1 || 2:31
|-style="background:#cfc;"
| 2018-12-08|| Win|| align=left| Kongnapa Weerasakreck || K-1 World GP 2018: K-1 Lightweight World's Strongest Tournament, Quarter Finals || Osaka, Japan || TKO (2 Knockdowns/Left hook) || 1 || 0:25
|-  style="background:#CCFFCC;"
| 2018-08-05|| Win ||align=left| Jun Nakazawa || Krush.91 || Tokyo, Japan || Decision (Split)|| 3 || 3:00
|-
! style=background:white colspan=9 |
|-  style="background:#CCFFCC;"
| 2018-05-17|| Win ||align=left| FUMIYA || Krush.88 || Tokyo, Japan || TKO (Referee Stoppage/Left Hook)|| 2 || 1:50
|-  style="background:#CCFFCC;"
| 2018-03-11|| Win ||align=left| Takaki Hosogoe || Krush.86 || Tokyo, Japan || Decision (Unanimous)|| 3 || 3:00
|-  style="background:#CCFFCC;"
| 2017-12-27|| Win ||align=left| Hayato Suzuki || K-1 WORLD GP 2017 JAPAN ～SURVIVAL WARS 2017～ || Tokyo, Japan || Decision (Split)|| 3 || 3:00
|-  style="background:#CCFFCC;"
| 2017-10-14|| Win ||align=left| FUMIYA || KHAOS.4 || Tokyo, Japan || KO (Right Cross)|| 3 || 1:04
|-  style="background:#CCFFCC;"
| 2017-08-20|| Win ||align=left| Kensei Kondo || Krush.79 ～in NAGOYA～ || Tokyo, Japan || KO (Punches)  || 2 || 1:30
|-  style="background:#FFBBBB;"
| 2017-02-18|| Loss ||align=left| Jun Nakazawa || Krush.73, Tournament Semifinals || Tokyo, Japan || KO (Left Hook)|| 2 || 1:50
|-  style="background:#CCFFCC;"
| 2016-11-03|| Win ||align=left| Tatsuya Mineyama || K-1 World GP 2016 Featherweight Championship Tournament || Tokyo, Japan || Decision (Unanimous) || 3 || 3:00
|-
|-  style="background:#FFBBBB;"
| 2016-07-18|| Loss ||align=left| Daiki Matsushita || Krush.67 || Tokyo, Japan || KO (Knees) || 2 || 0:57
|-  style="background:#CCFFCC;"
| 2016-04-24|| Win ||align=left| Yuki Koge || K-1 World GP 2016 -60kg Japan Tournament || Tokyo, Japan || KO (Punches)|| 2 || 1:15
|-  style="background:#CCFFCC;"
| 2014-12-21|| Win ||align=left| Shinichiro Kawasaki || DEEP KICK 23 || Osaka, Japan || Decision (Unanimous)|| 3 || 3:00
|-  style="background:#CCFFCC;"
| 2014-11-16|| Win ||align=left| Tasuku Kido ||  HOOST CUP KINGS WEST || Osaka, Japan || KO (Right Cross)|| 1 || 1:40
|-
| colspan=9 | Legend:    

|-  style="background:#CCFFCC;"
| 2015-11-21|| Win || align=left| Kensei Kondo|| K-1 Koshien 2015 Tournament, Final || Tokyo, Japan || KO (Body strike) || 3 || 1:39
|-
! style=background:white colspan=9 |
|-  style="background:#CCFFCC;"
| 2015-08-15|| Win || align=left| Kosuke Morii || K-1 Koshien 2015 Tournament, Semi Final || Tokyo, Japan || Decision || 1 ||2:00
|-  style="background:#CCFFCC;"
| 2015-08-15|| Win || align=left| Hyuma Hitachi || K-1 Koshien 2015 Tournament, Quarter Final || Tokyo, Japan || KO ||  ||
|-  style="background:#CCFFCC;"
| 2015-08-15|| Win || align=left| Seima Sano || K-1 Koshien 2015 Tournament, First Round || Tokyo, Japan || Decision || 1 ||2:00
|-  style="background:#FFBBBB;"
| 2014-07-21|| Loss || align=left| Ren Hiramoto || K-1 Koshien 2014 Tournament, Semi Final || Tokyo, Japan || Ext.R Decision (Majority) || 2 ||2:00
|-  style="background:#CCFFCC;"
| 2014-07-21|| Win || align=left| Haruma Saikyo || K-1 Koshien 2014 Tournament, Quarter Final || Tokyo, Japan || Decision || 1 ||2:00
|-  style="background:#CCFFCC;"
| 2014-07-21|| Win || align=left| Tsubasa Okamoto || K-1 Koshien 2014 Tournament, Second Round || Tokyo, Japan || KO ||  ||
|-  style="background:#CCFFCC;"
| 2014-07-21|| Win || align=left| Takuya Suzuki || K-1 Koshien 2014 Tournament, First Round || Tokyo, Japan || Decision || 3 ||2:00
|-  style="background:#CCFFCC;"
| 2014-02-16|| Win || align=left| Masayasu Nakazato || NJKF 2014 1st || Tokyo, Japan || Decision || 3 ||2:00
|-
! style=background:white colspan=9 |
|-  style="background:#FFBBBB;"
| 2013-09-22|| Loss|| align=left| Kaito Ono || DEEP KICK 17 || Osaka, Japan || Decision || 3 ||2:00
|-
! style=background:white colspan=9 |
|-  style="background:#FFBBBB;"
| 2013-07-07|| Loss|| align=left| Reo Yuasa || NEXT LEVEL Kansai 8 || Osaka, Japan ||Decision (Unanimous) ||2 ||3:00
|-  style="background:#FFBBBB;"
| 2013-03-17|| Loss|| align=left| Yuya Ootara || KJC Jr 7, Semi Final || Osaka, Japan || Ext.R Decision (Split) ||3 ||2:00
|-  style="background:#CCFFCC;"
| 2013-03-17|| Win || align=left| Koudai Ishida || KJC Jr 7, Quarter Final || Osaka, Japan || Decision ||2 ||2:00
|-  style="background:#CCFFCC;"
| 2013-02-10|| Win || align=left| Kaito || DEEP KICK 14 || Osaka, Japan || Decision || 3 ||2:00
|-
! style=background:white colspan=9 |
|-  bgcolor="#CCFFCC"
| 2012-12-16|| Win||align=left| Renta Nishioka ||NEXT☆LEVEL Kansai 3|| Osaka, Japan || TKO || 1 || 1:17
|-  style="background:#CCFFCC;"
| 2012-10-28|| Win || align=left| Yuma Okamura || NAGOYA KICK ～GUY IS BACK～ || Nagoya, Japan || Decision || 2 ||2:00
|-  style="background:#c5d2ea;"
| 2012-09-23|| Draw || align=left| Kaito || NEXT LEVEL Kansai 1 || Osaka, Japan || Decision || 2 ||2:00
|-  style="background:#CCFFCC;"
| 2012-09-23|| Win|| align=left| Shun Sakamoto || NEXT LEVEL Kansai 1 || Osaka, Japan || KO || 2 ||
|-  style="background:#FFBBBB;"
| 2012-07-08|| Loss|| align=left| Takayuki Minamino || DEEP KICK 12 - TOP RUN 3 || Osaka, Japan || Decision || 3 || 2:00
|-
! style=background:white colspan=9 |
|-  style="background:#CCFFCC;"
| 2012-04-29|| Win|| align=left| Izumi Yamada || DEEP KICK 11 || Osaka, Japan || Decision || 2 || 2:00
|-  style="background:#FFBBBB;"
| 2012-03-04|| Loss|| align=left| Yuya Ootara || NEXT LEVEL DOUBLE IMPACT II || Osaka, Japan || Decision || 2 || 2:00
|-  style="background:#CCFFCC;"
| 2012-02-05|| Win|| align=left| Toshiki Maeda || DEEP KICK 10 || Osaka, Japan || Decision || 2 || 2:00
|-  style="background:#CCFFCC;"
| 2011-10-23|| Win|| align=left| Teruhito Ogura || DEEP KICK 8 || Osaka, Japan || Decision || 2 || 2:00
|-  style="background:#CCFFCC;"
| 2011-09-04|| Win|| align=left| Yuya Ootara || DEEP OSAKA IMPACT || Osaka, Japan || Decision || 2 || 2:00
|-  style="background:#CCFFCC;"
| 2011-07-23|| Win|| align=left| Shun Sakamoto || KAKUMEI KICKBOXING || Osaka, Japan || Decision || 3 || 1:30
|-  style="background:#CCFFCC;"
| 2011-06-19|| Win|| align=left| Kazuha Handa || NJKF NEW JAPAN BLOOD 5 & 6 || Osaka, Japan || Decision || 3 || 2:00
|-  style="background:#cfc;"
| 2011-04-10|| Win || align=left| Jinki Maeda || DEEP KICK 6 || Osaka, Japan || Decision (Majority) || 2 || 2:00
|-
! style=background:white colspan=9 |
|-  style="background:#CCFFCC;"
| 2011-02-27|| Win|| align=left| Juri Umaki || NJKF Amateur || Osaka, Japan || KO || 1 ||
|-  style="background:#FFBBBB;"
| 2011-02-13|| Loss|| align=left| Ren Morita || NAGOYA KICK ～JET CITY～ || Osaka, Japan || Decision|| 2 || 2:00
|-  style="background:#cfc;"
| 2010-12-12|| Win || align=left| Seiya Hirahara || DEEP KICK 5 || Osaka, Japan || Decision || 2 || 2:00
|-
! style=background:white colspan=9 |
|-
| colspan=9 | Legend:

See also
 List of male kickboxers
 List of Krush champions

References

Living people
1998 births
Japanese male kickboxers
Sportspeople from Osaka
Bantamweight kickboxers